A number of ships were named, or intended to be named Aisne.

, ordered by Compagnie Générale Transatlantique, completed as Western Maid.
, a Design 1022 ship launched in 1920 as Sisladobsis. Commissioned as USS Aisne, later sold to Belgium as Vill de de Namur.

Ship names